Endgame is a 1999 short movie about chess between a man and a woman.

Cast
 Gabrielle Galanter as Natalie
 Ian Abercrombie as The Narrator (voice)
 Robert Gaylor as Gregory
 Micaela Moreno as Child
 Arturo Castillo as Photographer
 Antoinette Abbamonte as Chess fan
 Sharon Newman as Chess fan
 B.J. Shepherd as Chess fan
 Izzy as Lizard

External links

Chess in Cinema

Films about chess
1999 short films
1999 films
1990s English-language films